The 1999 Nebelhorn Trophy took place between September 1 and 4, 1999 at the Bundesleistungszentrum Oberstdorf. It is an international senior-level figure skating competition organized by the Deutsche Eislauf-Union and held annually in Oberstdorf, Germany. The competition is named after the Nebelhorn, a nearby mountain.

Skaters were entered by their respective national federations, rather than receiving individual invitations as in the Grand Prix of Figure Skating, and competed in four disciplines: men's singles, ladies' singles, pair skating, and ice dance. The Fritz-Geiger-Memorial Trophy was presented to the country with the highest placements across all disciplines.

In the men's free skating, Klimkin became the first skater to land two different quadruple jumps in one program (quad salchow and quad toe loop).

Results

Men

Ladies

Pairs

Ice dance

References

External links
 1999 Nebelhorn Trophy

Nebelhorn Trophy
Nebelhorn Trophy, 1999
Nebelhorn Trophy
Nebelhorn Trophy